was a district located in Fukuoka Prefecture, Japan..

As of 2003, the district had an estimated population of 64,913 and a density of 625.49 persons per km2. The total area was 103.78 km2.

Former towns and villages 
Setaka
Yamakawa

Merger 
On March 21, 2005 - the towns of Mitsuhashi and Yamato were merged into the expanded city of Yanagawa.
On January 29, 2007 - the towns of Setaka and Yamakawa, along with the town of Takata (from Miike District), were merged to create the city of Miyama. Yamato District was dissolved as a result of this merger.

Former districts of Fukuoka Prefecture